19 The Shambles is an historic building in the English city of York, North Yorkshire. A Grade II listed building, located on The Shambles, the building dates to the early 17th century, but it was refronted in the 18th century and renovated in the 19th and 20th centuries.

The storefront is made of red brick in a Flemish bond, with plain brick stringing at the middle and upper floors.

Internally on the ground floor, part of a 17th-century Arabesque frieze survives.

As of 2023, the building is occupied by The Gift Gallery.

References

19
Houses in North Yorkshire
Buildings and structures in North Yorkshire
16th-century establishments in England
Grade II listed buildings in York
Grade II listed houses
16th century in York